Dipodium conduplicatum  is an orchid species that is native to Peninsular Malaysia and Sumatra. The species was formally described in 1927 by Dutch botanist Johannes Jacobus Smith.

References

External links 

conduplicatum
Orchids of Indonesia
Orchids of Malaysia
Plants described in 1927